Henry Lucien de Vries (12 December 1909 – 6 April 1987) was a Surinamese politician and entrepreneur.

De Vries was born in Paramaribo. He studied economics at the Netherlands School of Economics and law at the University of Amsterdam. He was also trained as an officer at the Royal Military Academy Sandhurst. In 1946, he joined De Surinaamsche Bank, where he became a member of the management board.

He served as the Chairman of the Estates of Suriname from 1947 to 1949. Raymond Pos was initially nominated as Governor of Suriname, however he died on 5 November 1964. De Vries was Governor of Suriname from 1965 to 1968. He was the half-brother of the artist Erwin de Vries.

References 

1909 births
1987 deaths
Erasmus University Rotterdam alumni
Governors of Suriname
People from Paramaribo
20th-century Surinamese businesspeople
University of Amsterdam alumni
Chairmen of the Estates of Suriname
Royal Netherlands Army personnel of World War II